Hasegawa (written: 長谷川 literally "long valley river") is a Japanese surname. Hasegawa  may refer to:

People

A 
 Akiko Hasegawa, Japanese voice actress and singer
 Ariajasuru Hasegawa (born 1988), Japanese-Iranian footballer

B 
 Bob Hasegawa (born 1952), American-born labor union leader and Washington State congressperson

C 
 Chiyono Hasegawa (1896–2011), Japanese supercentenarian

D 
 Daigo Hasegawa (born 1990), Japanese athlete specialising in the triple jump

E 
 Emi Hasegawa (born 1986), Japanese alpine ski racer

H 
 Haruhisa Hasegawa (born 1957), Japanese football player
 Hasegawa Katsutoshi (born 1944), Japanese sumo wrestler
 Hasegawa Nyozekan (1875–1969), author
 Hasegawa Tōhaku (1539–1610), Edo period painter
 Hasegawa Yoshimichi (1850–1924), Chief of the Army General Staff
 Hatsunori Hasegawa (born 1955), Japanese actor 
 Hirokazu Hasegawa (born 1986), former Japanese football player
 Hiroki Hasegawa (長谷川 博己, born 1977), Japanese actor
 Hozumi Hasegawa (born 1980), Japanese professional boxer

I 
 Itsuko Hasegawa (born 1941), Japanese architect

J 
 Jun Hasegawa (born 1986), Japanese model
 Junya Hasegawa (born 1993), Japanese swimmer

K 
 Kazuhiko Hasegawa (born 1946), Japanese film director
 K-Ske Hasegawa, male Japanese light novelist 
 Kaitarō Hasegawa (1900-1935), Japanese novelist 
 Kaoru Hasegawa, male Japanese game artist of Spike Chunsoft's affiliation 
 Katsuji Hasegawa (born 1946), Japanese professional golfer
 Kazuo Hasegawa (1908–1984), Japanese actor
 Kazuto Hasegawa (born 1963), Japanese Renju player
 Keiichi Hasegawa (born 1962), Japanese screenwriter
, Japanese speed skater
, Japanese triple jumper
 Kensei Hasegawa (born 1943), Japanese politician
 Kenta Hasegawa (born 1965), former Japanese international football player
, Admiral in the Imperial Japanese Navy
 Kiyoshi Hasegawa (admiral) (1883-1970),  Japanese admiral and former Governor of Taiwan
 Kiyoshi Hasegawa (artist) (1891-1980), Japanese artist and engraver
 Kyōko Hasegawa (born 1978), Japanese model and actress
 Kohei Hasegawa (born 1984), amateur Japanese Greco-Roman wrestler
 Koki Hasegawa (born 1999), Japanese football player
 Kunihiro Hasegawa, Japanese film director

M 
 Machiko Hasegawa (1920–1992), manga artist, famous for Sazae-san
 Makoto Hasegawa (basketball) (born 1971), Japanese basketball coach and a former player
 Marii Hasegawa (1918-2012), Japanese peace activist
 Mitsuru Hasegawa (born 1979), former Japanese football player

N 
 Nobuhiko Hasegawa (1947–2005), table tennis player

R 
, Japanese voice actress
, Japanese footballer
, Japanese rugby union player

S 
 Saburo Hasegawa (1906–1957), Japanese calligrapher and painter
 Sadao Hasegawa (1945–1999), homoerotic artist
 Shigetoshi Hasegawa (born 1968), former Japanese baseball player
 Shin Hasegawa (rowing) (born 1940), Japanese rower
 Shizuka Hasegawa (born 1988), Japanese voice actress
 Sukehiro Hasegawa (born 1942), Japanese academic, educator, author and administrator
 Suzuka Hasegawa (born 2000), Japanese swimmer

T 
 Taichi Hasegawa (born 1981), former Japanese football player
 Takejirō Hasegawa, Japanese book publisher
, Japanese basketball player
, Japanese basketball player
, Japanese footballer
 Taro Hasegawa (born 1979), Japanese football player
 Tatsuo Hasegawa (1916-2008), Japanese automotive engineer
 Tatsuya Hasegawa (born 1994), Japanese football player
 Teru Hasegawa (1912-1947), Japanese Esperantist
 Tomoko Hasegawa-Fukushima (born 1963), Japanese sport shooter
 Toyoki Hasegawa (born 1986), Japanese football player
 Tomoki Hasegawa (born 1957), Japanese composer and arranger of music
 Toru Hasegawa (born 1988), Japanese footballer
, Japanese speed skater
, Japanese figure skater
 Tsuneo Hasegawa (1947–1991), Japanese mountain climber
 Tsuyoshi Hasegawa (born 1941), Japanese historian

W

Y 

 Yoko Hasegawa (born 1950), Japanese linguistics professor
 Yoshiyuki Hasegawa (born 1969), former Japanese football player
 Yu Hasegawa (born 1987), Japanese footballer
 Yui Hasegawa (born 1997), Japanese football player
 Yūki Hasegawa, professional shogi player
 Yuko Gordon (née Hasegawa, born 1951), Japan-born Hong Kong long-distance runner
 Yuko Hasegawa (curator), Chief Curator of the Museum of Contemporary Art, Tokyo 
 Yushi Hasegawa (born 1996), Japanese professional footballer
 Yuya Hasegawa (born 1984), Japanese baseball player

Fictional characters
 Chisame Hasegawa, a character in the manga and anime series Negima! Magister Negi Magi and Negima!?
Langa Hasegawa, a main character in the anime series SK8 the Infinity.
 Chisato Hasegawa, a character in the manga and anime series The Testament Of Sister New Devil
 Kobato Hasegawa, a character and the younger sister of the main character in the light novel and anime series Boku wa Tomodachi ga Sukunai 
 Kodaka Hasegawa, a main character in the light novel and anime series Boku wa Tomodachi ga Sukunai
 Sora Hasegawa, a character in the manga and anime series Oh My Goddess!
 Subaru Hasegawa, a main character in the light novel and anime series Ro-Kyu-Bu!
 Taizo Hasegawa, a character in the manga and anime series Gin Tama
 Hasegawa, a character in the 1981 movie Enter the Ninja
Zenkichi Hasegawa, a major character in the video game Persona 5 Strikers
Koichi Hasegawa, a name a Golden Kamuy's antagonist, Tokushirou Tsurumi, used while being a spy in Russia

Other uses 
 T. Hasegawa Co., Ltd., major producer of flavors and fragrances headquartered in Japan
 Hasegawa school, style of Japanese painting founded in the 16th century by Hasegawa Tōhaku
 Hasegawa–Mima equation, formula for describing the electric potential profile and plasma turbulence in a tokamak magnetic field
 Hasegawa Machiko Art Museum, art museum in Setagaya, Tokyo, Japan
 3227 Hasegawa, minor planet discovered on February 24, 1928 in Heidelberg 

Japanese-language surnames